Nationality words link to articles with information on the nation's poetry or literature (for instance, Irish or France).

Events

Works published

Great Britain
 Philip Sidney (attributed), Astrophil and Stella
 Richard Stanyhurst, 
 Thomas Watson,

Other
 Lodovico Castelvetro, Basle: Pietro de Sedabonis; Italian commentary on Petrarch, posthumous
 Philippe Desportes, an edition of his works; France
 Fernando de Herrera, Spain

Births
 January 28 - John Barclay, Scottish satirist and poet (died 1621)
 April 8 (bapt.) - Phineas Fletcher (died 1650), English
 November 21 - François Maynard (died 1646), French
 Late - Juan de Tassis, 2nd Count of Villamediana (died 1622), Spanish
 Also:
 Richard Corbet (died 1635), English poet and bishop
 Francesc Vicent Garcia (died 1623), Catalan poet
 Giovanni Valentini (died 1649), Italian Baroque composer, poet and keyboard virtuoso
 John Vicars (died 1652), English contemporary biographer, poet and polemicist of the English Civil War
 Possible date - Nef'i (executed 1635), Ottoman Turkish poet and satirist

Deaths
 July/August - Jacques Pelletier du Mans (born 1517), French humanist poet
 September 28 - George Buchanan (born 1506), Scottish historian, scholar, humanist and poet
 Arnoldus Arlenius (born 1510), Dutch humanist philosopher and poet
 Tashcali Yahya Bey, Ottoman Turkish poet
 Natalis Comes (born 1520), Italian mythographer, poet and historian
 Adam Reusner died sometime between 1563 and this year (born sometime from 1471 to 1496), German
 1582/1585: Pir Roshan (born 1525), Pashtun warrior poet and intellectual who wrote in Persian and Arabic
 1582/1583: Alexander Scott (born 1520), Scottish

See also

 Poetry
 16th century in poetry
 16th century in literature
 Dutch Renaissance and Golden Age literature
 Elizabethan literature
 French Renaissance literature
 Renaissance literature
 Spanish Renaissance literature
 University Wits

Notes

16th-century poetry
Poetry